Juan Manuel Gil Navarro (born August 15, 1973) is an Argentine actor, screenwriter, television producer and film director.

Biography 
Juan Gil Navarro is the son of Manuel Gil, a journalist and Alejandra Navarro, a secretary. Juan Gil Navarro studied at the German school Rudolf Steiner Schule in Florida, Vicente López Partido, Buenos Aires, Argentina.

Personal life 
In the year 1999, Juan Gil Navarro married in a religious ceremony with Malena Toia. The couple divorced in the year 2003. On August 3, 2006, Juan Gil Navarro married in a civil ceremony with Natalia Litvack. The couple divorced in the year 2018.

Filmography

Television

Theater

Movies

Discography

Soundtrack albums 

 2004 — Floricienta
 2007 — Floricienta

Awards and nominations

External links
 

1973 births
Argentine male television actors
Living people
People from Buenos Aires
Argentine people of Spanish descent